Zengjiayan  is a station on Line 2 of Chongqing Rail Transit in Chongqing Municipality, China. It is located in Yuzhong District. It opened in 2005. Line 10, which is currently under construction, will also reach this station.

Station structure

References

Yuzhong District
Railway stations in Chongqing
Railway stations in China opened in 2005
Chongqing Rail Transit stations